Club Deportivo Puertollano was a Spanish football team based in Puertollano, in the autonomous community of Castile-La Mancha. Founded in 1948 it played in Tercera División – Group 18, holding home matches at Estadio Ciudad de Puertollano, with a capacity of 8,000 seats.

History
Club Deportivo Puertollano was founded in 1948 as Club de Fútbol Calvo Sotelo. In 1999 the name of the club was changed to Unión Deportiva Puertollano and, in 2010, it was changed again, this time to Club Deportivo Puertollano.

On 1 July 2012 Puertollano was relegated to Tercera División by the Royal Spanish Football Federation, due to non-payment of wages to its players.

On 9 July 2014, Puertollano resigned to promote to Segunda División B due to the impossibility of getting an aval of €400,000.

On 15 May 2015, the members of the club voted in assembly its dissolution.

Club naming
CD Calvo Sotelo — (1948–53)
CF Calvo Sotelo — (1953–88)
Puertollano Industrial CF – (1988–1999)
UD Puertollano – (1999–2010)
CD Puertollano – (2010–2015)

Season to season
As Club Deportivo Calvo Sotelo and Club de Fútbol Calvo Sotelo

As Puertollano Industrial Club de Fútbol

As Unión Deportiva Puertollano

As Club Deportivo Puertollano

11 seasons in Segunda División
13 seasons in Segunda División B
40 seasons in Tercera División
3 seasons in Categorías Regionales

Honours
Tercera División: (9) 1958–59, 1960–61, 1961–62, 1962–63, 1963–64, 1974–75, 1999–2000, 2005–06, 2013–14
Copa Federación: (3) 1993–94, 2005–06, 2010–11

Current squad

Notable players

Club logos

References

External links
Official website 
Futbolme team profile 

 
Football clubs in Castilla–La Mancha
Association football clubs established in 1948
1948 establishments in Spain
Association football clubs disestablished in 2015
2015 disestablishments in Spain
Segunda División clubs